Chamor Hill is a hill located in São Mamede de Este, Braga, Portugal.

On the top of the hill, there is a monument to the Sacred Heart erected in 1957 with 20 meters high. The marble statue of Christ holds on the right hand the Chalice and the left hand is pointing to his hearth.

Hills of Portugal
Buildings and structures in Braga
Buildings and structures completed in 1957
Tourist attractions in Braga
Monuments and memorials in Portugal